David Ross Cohen is a Canadian-born musician and producer based out of Nashville, Tennessee. Cohen is a keyboardist who has recorded with Florida Georgia Line, Carrie Underwood, Kid Rock, Steven Tyler, and Reba McEntire. Throughout his career, he has accumulated several awards including Academy of Country Music Keyboard Player of the Year 2017 2019 & 2021 and Music Row All-Star Keyboards Player in 2018 & 2020. Over the course of his tenure in Nashville, Cohen has played on more than sixty #1 songs. 

Also making a name for himself as a producer, Cohen has produced 8 #1’s  for the likes of Jake Owen, Dallas Smith, and Chris Lane.

Early life and career 
Cohen was born August 30, 1985 in Toronto, Ontario, and moved to Calgary, Alberta at age 5. It was when he moved to Calgary that he began classical piano lessons. He attended Henry Wise Wood Senior High School in Calgary and later attended Humber College in Toronto where he focused on jazz performance, specifically jazz piano. Cohen began his career in Canada touring with stars Johnny Reid and Amanda Marshall. He was nominated twice for Keyboard Player of the Year at the Canadian Country Music Awards.

Current career 
Cohen moved to Nashville in April 2007 and has since amassed a number of notable credits. He began his time in Nashville touring with the likes of Joe Nichols, Big & Rich, and Wynonna Judd before making the shift to session work as a studio musician in 2012. Cohen has worked in the studio with a wide range of artists from Rascal Flatts to Ed Sheeran. Some of the most prominent country music artists he has worked with include Florida Georgia Line, Carrie Underwood, Old Dominion, Brett Eldredge, Chris Young, Walker Hayes, Jon Pardi, Cole Swindell, Josh Turner, Reba McEntire, Brooks and Dunn, and Kip Moore. In addition to working with these esteemed artists, Cohen has also collaborated with top notch producers like Joey Moi, Dann Huff, Tony Brown, Byron Gallimore, and Shane McAnally.

While making a name for himself as a successful studio musician, Cohen has also recently been working as a producer. Cohen has produced Australian artist Mick Lindsay and teamed up with fellow producer Joey Moi to co-produce Chris Lane's “Laps Around the Sun."

Cohen has worked on music from a number of genres including Country, Hip-Hop, Christian, and Rock. Cohen recently worked on Reba McEntire's “Sing it Now: Songs of Faith & Hope,” which won Best Roots Gospel Album at the 2018 GRAMMY Awards.

Discography

References 

1985 births
Living people
Canadian keyboardists
Canadian songwriters
Canadian Country Music Award winners